Oste is an Italian-language occupational surname literally meaning "innkeeper". Oste may also be the Swedish surname Öste without diacritics. Notable people with the surnames include:

 Joseph Julian Oste, bishop of the Roman Catholic Diocese of Rehe, China, 1948-1971
 Nemesi Marqués Oste (born 1935), Catholic priest, the personal representative to Andorra of the Bishop of Urgell from 1993 to 2012
 Bjorn Öste, a cofounder of Oatly, Swedish food company
Rickard Öste (born 1948),  Swedish scientist and businessman

See also

Occupational surnames
Italian-language surnames